R10 can refer to:
HMS Indefatigable (R10)
 Radial Road 10 or R-10, an arterial road of Manila, Philippines
 R10 (New York City Subway car)
 R10: Flammable, a risk phrase
 Audi R10 TDI, a sports prototype racing car built by Audi
 Expressway R10, an expressway in Czech Republic
 Neman R-10, a World War II Russian bomber
 USS R-10 (SS-87), a 1919 R-class coastal and harbor defense submarine of the United States Navy
 Kellett XR-10, an American helicopter
 R10 (Rodalies de Catalunya), a former commuter rail line in Barcelona, Catalonia, Spain

and also:
 a nickname for footballer Ronaldinho
 The R10 series of preferred numbers
 Carbon tetrachloride (R-10), a solvent
 The R10 battery, an old IEC 1.5 V battery size with dimensions 20x36 mm
 receptor 10, the tenth in line of a series of cellular receptors, generally at the end of an acronym